Thujacorticium is a genus of corticioid fungi in the Cyphellaceae family. The genus, circumscribed by J. Ginns in 1988, contains two species.

References

Cyphellaceae
Agaricales genera